Teatro dos Sete is a theatre in Rio de Janeiro, Brazil.
Founded in 1959 by Gianni Ratto, it has featured actors such as Fernanda Montenegro, Henriette Morineau, Sérgio Britto, Ítalo Rossi, and Fernando Torres.

References

Theatres in Rio de Janeiro (city)
1959 establishments in Brazil